Bunchosia argentea, known as silver peanut butter fruit, is a species of flowering plant in the acerola family, Malpighiaceae, that is native to Venezuela, Colombia, Peru, Brazil, Guyana and Suriname. It produces small orange-red fruits that are  sericeous (finely haired) of pleasant taste similar to peanut butter. Leaves have pointed ends and are densely silvery or golden sericeous on the abaxial side.

References

External links

argentea
Plants described in 1824
Trees of Colombia
Trees of Venezuela
Trees of Peru
Tropical fruit